Brenda Cox (17 April 1944 – 6 May 2015) was an Australian sprinter. At the 1962 British Empire and Commonwealth Games in Perth she won silver over 100 yards, finished fourth over 220 yards and won gold with the Australian 4 x 110-yard team.

Personal bests 
100 yards: 10.5s, 18 March 1961, Sydney, Australia
220 yards: 23.9s, 23 March 1963, Brisbane, Australia

External links 
 Brenda Cox at the Commonwealth Games Federation page

1944 births
2015 deaths
Athletes from Perth, Western Australia
Australian female sprinters
Commonwealth Games medallists in athletics
Commonwealth Games gold medallists for Australia
Commonwealth Games silver medallists for Australia
Commonwealth Games bronze medallists for Australia
Athletes (track and field) at the 1962 British Empire and Commonwealth Games
20th-century Australian women
21st-century Australian women
Medallists at the 1962 British Empire and Commonwealth Games